The 1925 German football championship, the 18th edition of the competition, was won by 1. FC Nürnberg, defeating FSV Frankfurt 1–0 after extra time in the final.

For 1. FC Nürnberg it was the fourth national championship. It was part of Nuremberg's most successful era where the club won five titles in eight seasons from 1920 to 1927, missing out on a sixth one in the inconclusive 1922 championship. For FSV Frankfurt it was the club's sole German championship final appearance.

Five players were the joint top scorers of the 1925 championship with three goals each, Arthur Warnecke, Georg Hochgesang, Heinrich Träg, Josef Lüke and Willi Kirsei.

Sixteen club qualified for the knock-out competition, nine more than in previous seasons, two from each of the regional federations plus an additional third club from the South and West. In all cases the regional champions and runners-up qualified. In the West and South the third spot went to the third placed team of the championship.

Qualified teams
The teams qualified through the regional championships:

Competition

Round of 16
The round of 16, played on 3 May 1925:

|}

Quarter-finals
The quarter-finals, played on 17 May 1925:

|}

Semi-finals
The semi-finals, played on 24 May 1925:

|}

Final

References

Sources
 kicker Allmanach 1990, by kicker, page 160 to 178 – German championship
 Süddeutschlands Fussballgeschichte in Tabellenform 1897-1988  History of Southern German football in tables, publisher & author: Ludolf Hyll

External links
 German Championship 1924–25 at weltfussball.de 
 German Championship 1925 at RSSSF

1
German
German football championship seasons